Tarache albifusa is a moth of the family Noctuidae first described by Clifford D. Ferris and J. Donald Lafontaine in 2009. It is found in the US state of Arizona.

The length of the forewings is 9.5–11 mm for males and about 10.5 mm for females. Adults are on wing from June to September.

External links
 

Acontiinae
Moths of North America
Moths described in 2009